Nick Taylor and David Wagner defeated the defending champions Antony Cotterill and Andrew Lapthorne in a rematch of the previous year's final, 6–4, 6–3 to win the quad title at the 2017 Wheelchair Doubles Masters.

Seeds

  Antony Cotterill /  Andrew Lapthorne (final)
  Nick Taylor /  David Wagner (champions)
  Heath Davidson /  Lucas Sithole (round robin, third place)
  Greg Hasterok /  Kim Kyu-seung (round robin, fourth place)

Draw

Finals

Round robin

References

External links

Quad doubles draw

Masters, 2017